The 2021–22 Stetson Hatters men's basketball team represented Stetson University in the 2021–22 NCAA Division I men's basketball season. The Hatters, led by third-year head coach Donnie Jones, played their home games at the Edmunds Center in DeLand, Florida as members of the East Division of the ASUN Conference. They finished the season 11–19, 5–11 in ASUN play to finish in last place in the East division. They lost in the first round of the ASUN tournament to Central Arkansas.

Previous season
In a season limited due to the ongoing COVID-19 pandemic, the Hatters finished the 2020–21 season 12–15, 7–9 in ASUN play to finish in seventh place. In the ASUN tournament, the Hatters defeated Bellarmine before losing to Liberty in the semifinals. They received a bid to the College Basketball Invitational tournament. They defeated Bowling Green in the quarterfinals before losing to Coastal Carolina in the semifinals.

Roster

Schedule and results

|-
!colspan=12 style=| Non-conference regular season

|-
!colspan=12 style=| ASUN regular season

 

|-
!colspan=12 style=| ASUN tournament
|-

|-

Source

References

Stetson Hatters men's basketball seasons
Stetson Hatters
Stetson Hatters men's basketball
Stetson Hatters men's basketball